Robinsonia bartolana is a moth in the family Erebidae. It was described by Michel Laguerre and Bernardo A. Espinoza in 2006. It is found in Nicaragua. and Costa Rica.

References

Moths described in 2006
Robinsonia (moth)